The BOC Site is a  archeological site in Haddam, Connecticut that was listed on the National Register of Historic Places in 1987 for its potential to yield information.  Its address is listed as restricted on the NRHP database.

See also
National Register of Historic Places listings in Middlesex County, Connecticut

References

Geography of Middlesex County, Connecticut
Archaeological sites in Connecticut
Haddam, Connecticut
Woodland period
Archaeological sites on the National Register of Historic Places in Connecticut
National Register of Historic Places in Middlesex County, Connecticut